Circle theorem may refer to:
 Any of many theorems related to the circle; often taught as a group in GCSE mathematics. These include:
Inscribed angle theorem.
Thales' theorem, if A, B and C are points on a circle where the line AC is a diameter of the circle, then the angle ∠ABC is a right angle. 
Alternate segment theorem.
Ptolemy's theorem.
The Milne-Thomson circle theorem in  fluid dynamics.
Five circles theorem
Six circles theorem
Seven circles theorem
Gershgorin circle theorem

See also
Clifford's circle theorems
Descartes' theorem also known as 'kissing circles' or 'Soddy circles' theorem
List of circle topics